The Dream Mixes is the first remix album by Tangerine Dream and their fifty-second overall. The album is a collection of extant Tangerine Dream songs remixed with a dance beat by Jerome Froese and is the first in a series that includes TimeSquare – Dream Mixes II (1997), DM3 – The Past Hundred Moons (2001), DM 4 (2003), DM 2.1 (2007), and DM V (2010). In 1996, the album was re-released as a two-CD set that included six new songs. This set was released again in 1998 as Dream Mixes One.

Track listing

Bonus Tracks from The Club Dream Mixes

References

1995 remix albums
Tangerine Dream albums